Deh Pish-e Sofla, also known as Deh Pish-e Pain, may refer to:
 Deh Pish-e Sofla, Jiroft
 Deh Pish-e Sofla, Kahnuj